Capital punishment in Nauru was used prior to its independence in 1968. Prior to the abolition of capital punishment on 12 May 2016, with the passage of the Crimes Act 2016, Amnesty International categorised Nauru as abolitionist in practice.

International agreements
Nauru is not yet party to the Second Optional Protocol to the International Covenant on Civil and Political Rights. In December 2012, Nauru voted in favour of the Resolution on a Moratorium on the Use of the Death Penalty at the United Nations General Assembly. Nauru was not present for the vote in the UN General Assembly on a moratorium on the death penalty in December 2014.

Despite having abolished the death penalty, Nauru voted against the UN Moratorium Resolution in 2018.

References

External links
 Hands Off Cain Page on Nauru

1968 establishments in Nauru
2016 disestablishments in Nauru
Nauru
Law of Nauru
Society of Nauru